Viva is the second and most successful album of Klaus Dinger's band La Düsseldorf. It has both "Rheinita", which was their most successful single, and "Cha Cha 2000", which has become their most famous song.

Different mixes/edits of "Rheinita" and "Viva" were released as a single; the single version of "Viva" is slightly longer and has a fadeout, the album version segues into "White Overalls". "Vögel" ("Birds") is a minute and a half of bird noises. All songs are written by Klaus Dinger.

Reception
Smash Hits said at the time of release, "If you're looking for something different or something new to pose with and say ever-so-casually 'oh, haven't you heard of them?' to your friends, then try this. It's modern German rock with lots of synthesisers but it's also bright and melodic and completely house-trained."

Track listing
All tracks composed by Klaus Dinger.

 "Viva" – 2:36
 "White Overalls" – 2:07
 "Rheinita" – 7:41
 "Vögel" – 1:27
 "Geld" – 6:35
 "Cha Cha 2000" – 19:53

Personnel
La Düsseldorf
Thomas Dinger – vocals, percussion
Hans Lampe – drums, percussion
Andreas Schell – piano on ' 6'
Klaus Dinger – vocals, percussion, guitars
Nikolas van Rhijn (a pseudonym for Klaus Dinger) – keyboards, synthesizers
Harald Konietzko – bass on ' 5' and ' 6'

References

1978 albums
La Düsseldorf albums
Radar Records albums